Elizabeth Bird  (1945 - 2021) was a British academic. She was dean of arts at the University of Bristol.

She studied at University of Perugia, Oxford University,  University of Sussex, and Cornell University.

She was a co-founder member of the Bristol Women’s Studies Group. She co-edited the book, Half the Sky. She was a printmaker with Spike Print Studio.

Works 

 Half the Sky: An Introduction to Women’s Studies ( 1979)
"Women's studies and the women's movement in Britain: origins and evolution, 1970–2000", Women's History Review, ISSN: 0961-2025

References

1945 births
2021 deaths
Academics of the University of Bristol
Alumni of the University of Oxford
Alumni of the University of Sussex
Cornell University alumni
British women academics
English printmakers
University of Perugia alumni
Women's studies academics